2-Methylthiophene is an organosulfur compound with the formula CH3C4H3S.  It is a colorless, flammable liquid.  It can be produced by Wolff-Kishner reduction of thiophene-2-carboxaldehyde. Its commercial synthesis involvess vapor-phase dehydrogenation of a 1-pentanol/CS2 mixture.

See also
3-Methylthiophene

References

Thiophenes